Anatolii Kovalevskyi (born 24 June 1990) is a Ukrainian male visually impaired cross-country skier and biathlete. He represented Ukraine at the 2014 Winter Paralympics and competed in the men's cross-country skiing and biathlon events. Anatolii Kovalevskyi also went onto represent Ukraine at the 2018 Winter Paralympics and secured a bronze medal in the men's 7.5km visually impaired biathlon event.

Career 
He took the sport of Paralympic Nordic skiing in 2009 and he was formerly coached by his own father, Ganna Glukhykh. He earned the opportunity to compete at the 2014 Winter Paralympics representing Ukraine, which was his maiden call-up to compete at the Paralympics. He secured a silver medal in the men's 15km visually impaired biathlon event with his sighted guide, Oleksandr Mukshyn.

References

External links 
 

1990 births
Living people
Ukrainian male biathletes
Ukrainian male cross-country skiers
Biathletes at the 2014 Winter Paralympics
Cross-country skiers at the 2014 Winter Paralympics
Biathletes at the 2018 Winter Paralympics
Cross-country skiers at the 2018 Winter Paralympics
Biathletes at the 2022 Winter Paralympics
Paralympic biathletes of Ukraine
Paralympic cross-country skiers of Ukraine
Paralympic gold medalists for Ukraine
Paralympic silver medalists for Ukraine
Paralympic bronze medalists for Ukraine
Medalists at the 2014 Winter Paralympics
Medalists at the 2018 Winter Paralympics
Medalists at the 2022 Winter Paralympics
Ukrainian blind people
Visually impaired category Paralympic competitors
Sportspeople from Kyiv
Paralympic medalists in biathlon
Cross-country skiers at the 2022 Winter Paralympics
20th-century Ukrainian people
21st-century Ukrainian people